James Richard Walsh is a former water polo representative from New Zealand.

At the 1950 British Empire Games, Walsh won the silver medal as goalkeeper of the New Zealand men's water polo team.

References
http://www.olympic.org.nz/nzolympic/athlete/jim-walsh

Year of birth missing
Year of death missing
Commonwealth Games silver medallists for New Zealand
New Zealand male water polo players
Water polo players at the 1950 British Empire Games
Commonwealth Games competitors for New Zealand